Jason Bacashihua (born September 20, 1982) is an American professional ice hockey goaltender who last played for Manchester Storm in the UK Elite Ice Hockey League (EIHL). He has played in the National Hockey League with the St. Louis Blues, various teams in the AHL and ECHL, HC 05 Banská Bystrica of the Slovak Extraliga, and High1 in Asia League Ice Hockey.

Playing career
Bacashihua was selected in the first round of the 2001 NHL Entry Draft by the Dallas Stars, 26th overall.  He spent two seasons with the Stars' AHL affiliate Utah Grizzlies before he was traded on June 25, 2004 to the St. Louis Blues for Shawn Belle.

Jason played for the Blues AHL affiliates, the Worcester IceCats and the Peoria Rivermen, before being called up to the main Blues roster and making his NHL debut in the 2005–06 season.  After failing to make the team out of training camp, Bacashihua was assigned to Peoria prior to the 2007–08 season.

On November 8, 2007, Bacashihua was traded by the Blues to the Colorado Avalanche for future considerations, and was assigned to the Avalanche's affiliate, the Lake Erie Monsters.  The Monsters are the same Grizzlies franchise, renamed and relocated, with whom Bacashihua started his AHL career. Bacashihua spent the next season and a half with the Monsters rotating the starting position with Tyler Weiman. During the 2008–09 season between February and March, Bacashihua won a franchise-best eight straight games. He was selected as the AHL Player of the Week (February 23 – March 1), to mark the first time in franchise history a Monsters player had received the award.

On July 31, 2009, Bacashihua signed a one-year contract with the Hershey Bears of the AHL for the 2009–10 season. He appeared in pre-season games for the Washington Capitals before being reassigned to Hershey. In 22 regular season games he won an impressive 17 however he was demoted to third choice goalie behind Capitals prospects and failed to make a playoff appearance for the Calder Cup winning Bears.

On July 2, 2010, Bacashihua returned to the Colorado Avalanche organization, signing a one-year contract as a free agent for the 2010–11 season. Assigned to reacquaint with the Lake Erie Monsters, Bacashihua split the season with former NHL goaltender John Grahame to form one of the best performing tandems in the AHL. He was recalled by the Avalanche on one occasion to serve as backup in place of the injured Craig Anderson, however failed to make his Avalanche debut. Returning to the Monsters to set a career professional best in goals against average, Bacashihua appeared in 42 games for 23 wins to help guide the Monsters to their first post-season berth.

On July 19, 2011, Bacashihua signed a one-year contract with the Philadelphia Flyers. Used primarily as a veteran backup within the Flyers organization, he spent the majority of the year with AHL affiliate, the Adirondack Phantoms. He was recalled twice to Philadelphia to dress and serve as a backup, however again was unable to mark a return to the NHL since 2007.

On July 22, 2012, Bacashihua was signed to his first professional European contract on a one-year deal to become a number one starter with German club, Straubing Tigers of the DEL. In making his DEL debut during the 2012–13 season, Bacashihua responded with the strong start with the Tigers to earn a one-year extension on December 28, 2012. He appeared in every game with the Tigers as their starting goalie to help gain a playoff position through qualification before losing in the first round.

In the two following seasons with the Tigers, Bacashihua was unable to prevent the club from missing the playoffs. With a decline statistically in his third season, Bacashihua was not offered a new contract at season's end with Straubing on March 3, 2015.

After not receiving a new contract, he moved to the Slovak Extraliga, where he played two seasons with HC 05 Banská Bystrica, leading the league in his second season with a 2.05 goals against average and helping Bystrica claim the Championship. For the 2017–18 season, he moved to South Korea and played with High1 in Asia League Ice Hockey.

At the start of the 2018–19 season, he continued his journeyman career in moving to Poland to play for Cracovia on September 28, 2018.

After spells with WSV Sterzing Broncos and Dunaújvárosi Acélbikák, Bacashihua signed for UK EIHL side Manchester Storm in November 2021, following an injury to the Storm's starting goaltender Matt Ginn.

Career statistics

Regular season and playoffs

Awards and honours

References

External links

1982 births
Adirondack Phantoms players
American men's ice hockey goaltenders
HC '05 Banská Bystrica players
Chicago Freeze players
MKS Cracovia (ice hockey) players
Dallas Stars draft picks
Deggendorfer SC players
Dunaújvárosi Acélbikák players
Hershey Bears players
High1 players
Ice hockey players from Michigan
Johnstown Chiefs players
Lake Erie Monsters players
Living people
Manchester Storm (2015–) players
National Hockey League first-round draft picks
People from Dearborn Heights, Michigan
Peoria Rivermen (AHL) players
Plymouth Whalers players
St. Louis Blues players
Straubing Tigers players
Utah Grizzlies (AHL) players
Worcester IceCats players
American expatriate ice hockey players in Germany
American expatriate ice hockey players in Slovakia
American expatriate ice hockey players in South Korea
American expatriate ice hockey players in Hungary
American expatriate ice hockey players in Poland
American expatriate ice hockey players in England
American expatriate ice hockey players in Italy